José Coelho may refer to:
José Coelho (footballer, born 1961), Portuguese footballer who played as a forward
José Coelho (footballer, born 1990), Portuguese footballer who plays as a midfielder
José Manuel Coelho (born 1952), Portuguese communist politician
José Pinto Coelho (born 1960), Portuguese far-right and nationalist politician